Live in Germany may refer to:

Live in Germany 1976, album by Rainbow
Live in Germany (Joe Lynn Turner album)
Live in Germany (Héroes del Silencio album)